Narsipatnam is a census town in Anakapalle district of the Indian state of Andhra Pradesh. It was upgraded from  a gram panchayat into municipality in 2012. The town is spread over an area of  The resting place of the revolutionary Indian freedom fighter Alluri Sitarama Raju is located in Krishna Devi Peta village of From Narsipatnam to labasingi Village 30 kms only.. labasingi most popular winter tourism place..so many Tourists enjoy -2 degree's temparature there..

Geography
It has an average elevation of 58 metres (190 feet). This is one of the five places in India where the IST line passes

Demographics

 Census of India, the town had a population of 33,757. The total population constitutes, 16,076 males and 17,681 females—a sex ratio of 1100 females per 1000 males, higher than the national average of 940 per 1000. 3,262 children are in the age group of 0–6 years, of which 1,684 are boys and 1,578 are girls—a ratio of 937 per 1000.
The average literacy rate stands at 78.83% with 24,040 literates, significantly higher than the national average of 73.00%.

Transport 

Narsipatnam railway station is classified as a D–category stations in the Vijayawada railway division of South Coast Railway zone.

APSRTC bus service is available to district headquarters Visakhapatnam and Tuni Railway station and to Bhadrachalam, Chintapalli, Sileru, Malkangiri, Anakapalli, Chodavaram, Kakinada, Annavaram.

Legislative Assembly
Narsipatnam is an assembly constituency in Andhra Pradesh. There are 1,95,804 registered voters in Narsipatnam constituency in 2009 elections.

Education
The primary and secondary school education is imparted by government, aided and private schools, under the School Education Department of the state. The medium of instruction followed by different schools are English, Telugu.

References 

Cities and towns in Anakapalli district